Wudu District is a district and the political and cultural centre of Longnan, Gansu province, China. It borders the provinces of Shaanxi and Sichuan to the southeast. It has a population of 590,000, of which 110,000 live in the urban area.

Located along the Bailong River near the borders with Sichuan and Shaanxi, it has been the site of many historic battles. A town has existed at the current county seat since at least 448. In 572 this town was named Wuzhou (武州), in 892 it was named Jiezhou. Since 1260 it was part of Shaanxi province, becoming part of Gansu in 1729. In 1913, Wudu County was established. The current district was established from Wudu County in 2004.

The epicentre of the 1879 Gansu earthquake was located in the district.

Wudu is one of the top tourist destinations in Gansu, receiving over 2 million tourists in 2016. The Wanxiang karst cave is located 10 km from the city. Its agricultural output includes olive cultivation, traditional Chinese medicine crops and Sichuan pepper.

Administrative divisions
Wudu District is divided to 4 subdistricts, 26 towns, 8 townships and 2 ethnic townships.
Subdistricts

Towns

Townships

Ethnic townships
 Pingya Tibetan Township
 Moba Tibetan Township

Transport 
China National Highway 212
China National Highway 345
G75 Lanzhou–Haikou Expressway
G8513 Pingliang–Mianyang Expressway
Chongqing–Lanzhou railway

See also
 List of administrative divisions of Gansu

References

Wudu District
Longnan